Route Point is a rocky point marking the northwest extremity of Laurie Island, in the South Orkney Islands. Discovered and named by Captain George Powell and Captain Nathaniel Palmer during their joint cruise in December 1821.
 

IT- Route point: A call queue or route point is a special address within the switch where calls are temporarily held pending action.

Laurie Island
Headlands of the South Orkney Islands